Heads I Win, Tails You Lose (also known as Heads or Tails) is a 1982 Italian comedy film written and directed by Nanni Loy.

The film consists in two back-to-back stories that deals with two "taboo" themes, the celibacy of the clergy in the episode of Renato Pozzetto and the homosexuality in the one with Nino Manfredi.

Cast

La pecorella smarrita
Renato Pozzetto: Father Remigio
Mara Venier: Teresa
Mario Cei: Don Ugo

Il figlio del Beduino
Nino Manfredi: Beduino
Paolo Stoppa: The grandfather
Leo Gullotta: Walter
Ida Di Benedetto: Stefania
Maurizio Micheli: Doctor

References

External links

1982 films
Films set in Rome
Films directed by Nanni Loy
Films scored by Carlo Rustichelli
Italian comedy films
Commedia all'italiana
Films about Catholic priests
Films about clerical celibacy
1982 comedy films
1980s Italian-language films
1980s Italian films